Calliclinus geniguttatus is a species of labrisomid blenny native to the Pacific coast of Chile and the Atlantic coast of Argentina.  This species primarily preys on amphipods when young, shifting to decapods as they mature.  It can reach a length of  TL.

References

External links 
 Clinus elegans at Museum National d'Histoire Naturelle (Paris)
 Clinus elegans at fishwisepro.com

geniguttatus
Fish described in 1836